Corey Williams (born April 24, 1970) is an American retired professional basketball player and current interim head coach for the Texas Tech Red Raiders of the Big 12 Conference. He is the former men's basketball head coach of Stetson University.

A 6'2" (1.88 m) point guard from Oklahoma State University, Williams was selected by the Chicago Bulls in the second round of the 1992 NBA draft.  He played one season with the Bulls, averaging 2.3 points in 35 games as a reserve on a team which won the NBA Championship.  He then spent the 1993-94 season with the Minnesota Timberwolves, scoring 11 points in 4 games.  He spent the majority of the 1994 season with the Oklahoma City Cavalry of the Continental Basketball Association.

Williams was also selected by the Kansas City Chiefs in the twelfth round of the 1992 NFL Draft, despite not having played football since junior high. He never joined the Chiefs.

After his playing career in the American professional leagues, Williams returned to Oklahoma State as a student assistant and was a member of the Cowboys' staff during their 1994 Final Four season.  In 1995, Williams resumed to play professionally as he joined the Dacin Tigers of the Chinese Basketball Alliance in Taiwan.  He was the assist leader and one of the main scorers for his team throughout the three seasons he played there until 1998.  From 2000 to 2007, Williams was an assistant coach at Oral Roberts, and from 2007-13 he was an assistant coach at Florida State University.

On June 3, 2013, Williams was named the head coach of Stetson. He was fired on March 6, 2019 with a six-year record of 58–133.

Head coaching record

References

External links
NBA career statistics

1970 births
Living people
African-American basketball coaches
African-American basketball players
American expatriate basketball people in Taiwan
American men's basketball coaches
American men's basketball players
Arkansas Razorbacks men's basketball coaches
Basketball coaches from Georgia (U.S. state)
Basketball players from Georgia (U.S. state)
Chicago Bulls draft picks
Chicago Bulls players
Florida State Seminoles men's basketball coaches
Grand Rapids Mackers players
Minnesota Timberwolves players
Oklahoma City Cavalry players
Oklahoma State Cowboys basketball players
Oral Roberts Golden Eagles men's basketball coaches
People from Twiggs County, Georgia
Point guards
Stetson Hatters men's basketball coaches
Texas Tech Red Raiders basketball players
21st-century African-American sportspeople
20th-century African-American sportspeople
Dacin Tigers players